Preman is a 2021 Indonesian action film, directed, co-produced and written by Randolph Zaini in his directorial debut. The film stars Khiva Iskak and Muzzaki Ramdhan. The film had its world premiere at the 2021 Seattle International Film Festival.

Premise
A deaf criminal with a traumatic past and his son must fight their way out of their small village after witnessing a horrible murder.

Cast

Release
Preman had its world premiere at the 2021 Seattle International Film Festival. During its run, the film screened at the Shanghai International Film Festival and Fantastic Fest.

Accolades

References

Indonesian action films
2021 action films
2021 directorial debut films
Films about deaf people
2020s Indonesian-language films